Necherezy is a rural locality (an aul) in Ponezhukayskoye Rural Settlement of Teuchezhsky District, the Republic of Adygea, Russia. The population was 307 as of 2018. There are 3 streets.

Geography 
The aul is located in 5 km to the north of Ponezhukay aul.

Ethnicity 
The aul is inhabited by Circassians.

References 

Rural localities in Teuchezhsky District